William Hargrave (birth unknown – death unknown) was a professional rugby league footballer who played in the 1920s and 1930s.

Playing career

County honours
William Hargrave won a cap for Yorkshire while at Castleford, he played , i.e. number 2, in the 17–22 defeat by Glamorgan & Monmouth at Cardiff on 15 April 1929.

Club career
William Hargrave made his début for Castleford in the 0–22 defeat by Hull F.C. on 28 August 1926.

References

External links
Search for "Hargrave" at rugbyleagueproject.org
William Hargrave Memory Box Search at archive.castigersheritage.com
Bill Hargrave Memory Box Search at archive.castigersheritage.com

Living people
Castleford Tigers players
English rugby league players
Place of birth missing (living people)
Rugby league wingers
Year of birth missing (living people)
Yorkshire rugby league team players